The United States Air Force's 55th Mobile Command and Control Squadron (55 MCCS) was a mobile command and control unit located at Offutt AFB, Nebraska.

History
Personnel of the 55 MCCS were trained in their primary specialty, in addition to vital expeditionary capabilities that ensure survival.

Logo Significance
Blue and yellow are the Air Force colors.  Blue alludes to the sky, the primary theater of Air Force operations.  Yellow refers to the sun and the excellence required of Air Force personnel.

Previous designations
 55th Mobile Command and Control Squadron (1 July 1994 – 30 September 2006)

Bases stationed
 Offutt AFB, Nebraska (1 July 1994 – 30 September 2006)

Commanders
 Lt Col John J. Jordan (2000–2002)
 Maj. Karen Hibbard (2005-2006)
 Lt Col Ronald J. Hefner (1997-1999)

Equipment Utilized
 Mobile Consolidated Command Center (1998–Present),
 MILSTAR
 DSCS
 Single Channel Anti-Jam Manpower (SCAMP) terminals

Decorations
 Air Force Outstanding Unit Award 
 1 July 1994 – 31 July 1995
 1 June 1997 – 31 May 1999
 1 June 1999 – 31 May 2001
 1 June 2002 – 31 May 2004
 1 June 2004 – 31 May 2006

See also
 4th Command and Control Squadron
 153d Command and Control Squadron
 721st Mobile Command and Control Squadron

References

External links
 Unofficial 55th MCCS Reaper Locator

Military units and formations in Nebraska
Mobile Command and Control 0055